Norra Bantorget ("Northern Railway Square") is an area in central Stockholm, named after the location where the first Stockholm North Station was built. It is the traditional Social Democratic grounds of the Swedish capital. It is the location of the LO headquarters, the Swedish Trade Union Confederation.

At Norra Bantorget is also the Workers Movement's Archive and Library, and Folkets hus (where Russian social democrats held their Fourth Congress in 1906). There are several monuments of working class leaders erected at Norra Bantorget, including a statue of August Palm and the Branting Monument. A street in the area is named after Olof Palme.

Norra Bantorget is a traditional gathering spot for demonstrations, such as the ones arranged by the Social Democrats on May Day.

There is also a newly erected four-star Clarion hotel, Clarion Hotel Sign, located on the right side of the square as seen from the LO-building.

Squares in Stockholm
Swedish Social Democratic Party